The 2020 season was PDRM's 30th season in existence. Along with the league, the club also participated in the Malaysia Cup.

Overview
On 24 January 2020, club announced 15 Malay Royal policemen registered as new players.

Competitions

Malaysia Super League

Statistics

Appearances and goals

|-
!colspan="14"|Players away from the club on loan:
|-
!colspan="14"|Players who left PDRM during the season:

|}

References

2020
PDRM
Royal Malaysia Police FC